Óscar Hernández Pérez (born 10 April 1978 in Barcelona, Spain) is a former professional male tennis player from Spain. He turned pro in 1998 and achieved his career-high singles ranking of World No. 48 in October 2007. Hernández scored an upset in the first round of the 2007 Rome Masters, when he defeated the World No. 20, Lleyton Hewitt, 3–6, 7–6(3), 6–1.  Hernández announced his retirement from tennis on 22 July 2011.

ATP career finals

Doubles: 1 (1 win, 1 loss)

ATP Challenger titles

Singles

References

External links

 

1978 births
Living people
Tennis players from Catalonia
Spanish male tennis players
Tennis players from Barcelona